Carrier is the fifth studio album by indie folk band The Dodos. It was released in August 2013 under Polyvinyl Record Co.

Track listing

References

2013 albums
The Dodos albums
Polyvinyl Record Co. albums